The 1986 Bordeaux Open also known as the Nabisco Grand Prix Passing Shot was a men's tennis tournament played on clay courts at Villa Primrose in Bordeaux, France that was part of the 1986 Nabisco Grand Prix. It was the ninth edition of the tournament and was held from 7 July until 11 July 1986. Unseeded Paolo Canè won the singles title.

Finals

Singles
 Paolo Canè defeated  Kent Carlsson 6–4, 1–6, 7–5
 It was Canè's first singles title of his career.

Doubles
 Jordi Arrese /  David de Miguel defeated  Ronald Agénor /  Mansour Bahrami 7–5, 6–4

References

External links
 ITF tournament edition details

Bordeaux Open
ATP Bordeaux
Bordeaux Open
Bordeaux Open